Joe Schenck may refer to:

Joseph M. Schenck  (1876–1961), American film studio executive
Joe Schenck (1891–1930), half of the vaudeville musical duo Van and Schenck